Lappalanjärvi is a medium-sized lake of Finland in the Kouvola municipality in the region Kymenlaakso. It belongs to the Kymijoki main catchment area.

See also
List of lakes in Finland

References

Lakes of Kouvola